A company switch is a basic electrical switch design. They are used for power distribution systems in theaters, arenas, convention centers, that often require panel boards for electrical equipment.

Company switches are designed to be easy to use, easily portable, safe and fast.

References 

Switches